Józef Łaszewski (30 November 1901 – ?) was a Polish rower. He competed at the 1928 Summer Olympics in Amsterdam with the men's eight where they were eliminated in the quarter-final.

References

1901 births
Year of death missing
Polish male rowers
Olympic rowers of Poland
Rowers at the 1928 Summer Olympics
Rowers from Warsaw
People from Warsaw Governorate
European Rowing Championships medalists